The Eastern Reception, Diagnostic and Correctional Center (ERDCC) is a 2,684-bed prison located in a detached eastern section of Bonne Terre, Missouri. It is home to adult males who may have substance abuse issues or are mentally disabled. 

The ERDCC serves as the point of admission for male offenders committed by the courts in eastern Missouri to the Missouri Department of Corrections (MODOC), responsible for their classification through medical and mental tests. It contains Missouri's lethal injection execution chamber.
Programs at this facility include restorative justice, Narcotics Anonymous and Alcoholics Anonymous, Impact on Crime, Seven points of highly successful people, and Storylink.

It operates a cooked and chilled food facility, a unit that prepares and transports all regular and special diet meals to the Potosi Correctional Center, Farmington Correctional Center and Missouri Eastern Correctional Centers and the St. Louis Community Release Center. 

NPR reported about an outbreak of COVID-19 cases in August 2021. Universal testing for COVID-19 had not occurred since August 2020 even though ERDCC is an intake facility for prisoners brought in from county jails which do not have the same testing, quarantine and isolation protocols as the DOC. Severe staffing shortage caused inmates to be held on extended and frequent lockdowns, unable to leave their cells, not even for medical appointments.

Notable inmates
Ernest Lee Johnson – Triple murderer. Murdered three convenience store workers in Columbia, Missouri.
Levi King – Spree killer. Murdered a family in Gray County, Texas. Featured on Investigation Discovery's Most Evil.
Stephan Cannon - Murderer of retired police chief David Dorn.

See also
Capital punishment in Missouri

References

External links 

 history of the facility in local press dailyjournalonline.com, subscription only

Prisons in Missouri
Capital punishment in Missouri
Buildings and structures in St. Francois County, Missouri
Execution sites in the United States
2003 establishments in Missouri